Daniel J. Rasmussen (born August 12, 1947) is the Iowa State Representative from the 23rd District since 2011. A Republican, he had previously served in the Iowa House of Representatives from 2003 to 2009.  He received his BS from Iowa State University.  He is the Executive Director for the Iowa Chapter of Land Improvement Contractors of America (ILICA).

, Rasmussen serves on several committees in the Iowa House - the Agriculture, Economic Growth/Rebuild Iowa, Natural Resources, and Transportation committees.  His prior political experience included serving on the Independence School Board.

Electoral history
Rasmussen first ran for election to the Iowa House in 2000, losing the election to the 28th District's incumbent Democrat, Steve Falck.  The legislative districts were redrawn for the 2002 election, and Rasmussen defeated Democratic opponent Jeanette Randall in the race for the 23rd District.  Rasmussen won re-election biennially until 2008, when he lost to Democrat Gene Ficken.  In 2010, Rasmussen won the seat back in a re-match with Ficken.

*incumbent

References

External links

 Rasmussen on Project Vote Smart
 Rasmussen's Capitol Web Address

Republican Party members of the Iowa House of Representatives
1947 births
Living people
Iowa State University alumni
People from Independence, Iowa